Pogonocherus caroli is a species of beetle in the family Cerambycidae. It was described by Mulsant in 1863. It is known from France, Algeria, Tunisia, Spain, and (since 2006) Scotland.

Subspecies
 Pogonocherus caroli caroli Mulsant, 1863
 Pogonocherus caroli icosiensis Peyerimhoff, 1918

References

Pogonocherini
Beetles described in 1863